Mollie Elizabeth Pathman (born July 1, 1992) is a retired American soccer forward and midfielder who played for Boston Breakers in the National Women's Soccer League.

Early life
Born in Chapel Hill, North Carolina to parents Don and Beth Pathman, Mollie was raised with her brother Josh in Durham.  She attended Durham Academy and graduated as the all-time leading scorer with 130 goals and 65 assists in the history of the team. Pathman received Parade All-American honors in 2009 and 2010 and was named the 2010 Gatorade National High School Player of the Year.

Duke University
Pathman attended Duke University, where she played for the Blue Devils from 2010 – 2013.

Club career

Boston Breakers
Pathman was selected by the Boston Breakers as the 23rd overall pick of the 2014 NWSL College Draft. She signed with the team in April of the same year.

On July 15, 2016, Pathman announced her retirement from professional soccer to pursue a career in the medical field.

International career
Pathman has represented the United States at various youth levels. She played on the United States women's national under-20 soccer team for both the 2010 and 2012 FIFA U-20 Women's World Cup. The US team won the latter tournament.

Personal life

Pathman resides in Durham, North Carolina with her dog, Theodore, and practices as a physical therapist.

References

External links
 
 Duke player profile
 Boston Breakers player profile
 

Living people
1992 births
American women's soccer players
Duke Blue Devils women's soccer players
Boston Breakers players
National Women's Soccer League players
Apollon Ladies F.C. players
Women's association football midfielders
Women's association football forwards
Boston Breakers draft picks
United States women's under-20 international soccer players
Soccer players from North Carolina
People from Chapel Hill, North Carolina
Sportspeople from Durham, North Carolina